The Korea National Insurance Corporation is an insurance company owned by the North Korean government, founded in 1947. It has about 210 branches throughout the country.

While mainly carrying on as an insurance Company, The Korean National Insurance Corporation has also conducted other business activities, such as automotive repair, information technology service, and financial involvements.

Korean National Insurance Corporation's Executive Committee of Management 
The Korean National Insurance Corporation's executive committee of Management is the Top Managing Body of the Korean National Insurance Corporation. Its job is to decide on Important Manners relating to the operation of the Korean National Insurance Corporation, Including a Business Strategy as well as Operational Philosophy and supervises their Implementation. The executive committee of Management is responsible for the general operation of the Korean National Insurance Corporation and composes of people working with the company for many years.

Controversies 
It has been claimed it is a front to funnel money to the North Korean nuclear weapons program.

References

External links
 

Government-owned companies of North Korea
Government-owned insurance companies
Insurance companies of North Korea